Iosegun Lake is a lake in northwest Alberta within the Municipal District of Greenview No. 16.

Iosegun is a name derived from an Indigenous language denoting "tail".

Provincial recreation area 
The Iosegun Lake Provincial Recreation Area is located on the southeast shore of Iosegun Lake at the mouth of an unnamed creek originating at nearby Raspberry Lake to the east.

Camping 
Operated by the Town of Fox Creek, the recreation area includes a campground featuring 52 campsites, a day use site, and a group use site. Camping season begins on May 24 and ends on October 1.

Recreation 
Other recreational activities include canoeing/kayaking, cross-country skiing, fishing, ice fishing, power boating, snowmobiling (off-site), swimming, and water skiing.

Fish species 
Fish species in Iosegun Lake include burbot, lake whitefish, northern pike, spottail shiner, trout-perch, tullibee (cisco), walleye, white sucker, and yellow perch.

See also
List of lakes of Alberta

References

External links 
Atlas of the Lakes – Iosegun Lake
Iosegun Lake Provincial Recreation Area

Municipal District of Greenview No. 16
Iosegun Lake